1979–80 in English field hockey. The Men's Cup was won by Slough and the Women's Cup was won by Norton.

The Men's National Inter League Championship brought together the winners of their respective regional leagues. The championship (held in September 1980) was won by Slough.

As from the 1980–81 season the National Inter League Championship would be held in the spring of the same season instead of the Autumn of the following season.

Men's Truman National Inter League Championship 
(Held at Barclays Bank Sports Ground, North Ealing, September 20–21)

Group A

Group B

Final 

Slough
Ian Taylor, Paul Barber, Manjit Flora, Andy Churcher, Steve Partington, Sutinder Singh Khehar, Brajinder Daved, Stuart Collins, Ken Partington, Balwant Saini, Ravinder Laly, Bhaji Flora
Westcliff
M Kay, R Holmes, P Wakeford, R Hilton, N Havens, P Anderson, N Boddington, T Copping, Ian Towler, M Bond, J French

Men's Cup (Rank Xerox National Clubs Championship)

Quarter-finals

Semi-finals

Final 
(Held at Guildford Hockey Club on 27 April)

Slough
Ian Taylor, Mike Parris, Paul Barber, Manjit Flora, John Allen, Sutinder Singh Khehar, Brajinder Daved, Ken Partington, Ravinder Laly (Stuart Collins sub), Balwant Saini, John Murdock 
Guildford
R Wright, I Carley, Andrew Cairns, J Bowerman, Ian Pinks, N Taylor, A Jeans, P Penock, Neil Francis, C Booker (P Rosomund sub), C Coddrell

Women's Cup (National Clubs Championship) 
(University of East Anglia, Norwich, April 13–14)

Participants 

Norton squad
Jule Hopkins, Annette Imisson, Jenny Manser, Anne Whitworth, Delphine Brady, Sue Readhead, Judy Pringle, Gill Pedley, Maureen Thersby, Jackie Edwards, Dot Anderson, Anne Wright, Sue Driver

References 

1979
field hockey
field hockey
1979 in field hockey
1980 in field hockey